Merry Akane Karnowsky is a Los Angeles art dealer and gallerist of Japanese and Polish-German ancestry.

Karnowsky was born in Eastern Washington State and educated at Pitzer College - Claremont, California. In 1997, she opened The Merry Karnowsky Gallery in Los Angeles, California, and was influential in the underground "Lowbrow (art movement)," pop surrealism, and Street Art scene, with exhibitions by Shepard Fairey, Camille Rose Garcia, Mercedes Helnwein and Todd Schorr.

References

Sources 
Juxtapoz Magazine , "Insiders: Merry Karnowsky", Volume 14, Number 6, June 2007, pg. 44-45.
Nylon Guys Magazine, "Sifting Through The Madness",  Summer 2007, pg. 30.

Further information 
 Merry Karnowsky Gallery

American art dealers
Women art dealers
Living people
Pitzer College alumni
Year of birth missing (living people)